Ilana Kurshan is an American-Israeli author who lives in Jerusalem.  She is best known for her memoir of Talmud study amidst life as a single woman, a married woman, and a mother, If All the Seas Were Ink.

Personal life 
Kurshan was raised on Long Island as the daughter of a Conservative rabbi and an executive at UJA-Federation of New York.  She graduated from Huntington High School, Harvard College, and Cambridge University, where she studied the History of Science and English Literature.  She worked as an editor and literary agent in New York before moving to Jerusalem with her first husband for his rabbinic studies.  Although her first marriage quickly crumbled, Kurshan stayed in Jerusalem, working as a translator and foreign-rights agent.  In her memoir, she describes how she found a lifeline in the Daf Yomi, the daily study of the Babylonian Talmud, applying its richness to her life as first a single woman, and then as a remarried wife and mother.

Professional career 
In addition to her own books, Kurshan has translated books by Ruth Calderon and Binyamin Lau from Hebrew to English. She is the Book Review Editor for Lilith magazine, and her writings have appeared in Lilith, The Forward, The World Jewish Digest, Hadassah, Nashim, Zeek, Kveller, and Tablet.

Selected works 
 If All the Seas Were Ink, 2017
 Why is This Night Different from All Other Nights?: The Four Questions Around the World,2008
Translation: A Snake, A Flood, A Hidden Baby (originally in Hebrew by Meir Shalev) Kalaniot Books, 2021

See also 
 Hadran (organization)

References

External links 
 Ilana Kurshan's web site.

Living people
People from Huntington, New York
American women writers
Israeli women writers
Jewish women writers
Harvard University alumni
Alumni of the University of Cambridge
Year of birth missing (living people)
American emigrants to Israel